Bifrenaria verboonenii is a species of orchid.

verboonenii